Luis Quiñones may refer to:

 Luis Quiñones de Benavente (1581–1651), Spanish entremesista
 Luis Quiñones (baseball) (born 1962), Puerto Rican baseball player
 Luis Quiñones (footballer) (born 1991), Colombian footballer
 Luis Quiñones (weightlifter) (born 2001), Colombian weightlifter

See also
 Luis Quiñonez (disambiguation)